The Devil's Feather is a 2005 psychological thriller novel by British author Minette Walters.

Plot 
Connie Burns is a British-Zimbabwean journalist working as a war correspondent for the Reuters agency. While stationed in Sierra Leone in 2002 she reports on the case of five women who have been brutally murdered. Burns suspects a British mercenary, who is known throughout the expatriate community for his brutality and violence. She encounters the mercenary again two years later while based in Baghdad to cover the Iraq conflict. She begins to make discrete enquiries about him, but is frightened off by a series of incidents in which her hotel room is repeatedly ransacked. Deciding to return to the United Kingdom, Burns is kidnapped on her way to the airport, but released three days later.

Upon her release, Burns returns to England, avoiding reporters (including her former Reuters colleagues) who are keen to hear about her ordeal. Leasing a remote house on the Dorset coast she sets about trying to guard her privacy and her security. But escaping her past proves to be more difficult. She befriends a local woman named Jess Derbyshire, a reclusive woman who has isolated herself from her community following a family tragedy. Seeing parallels between herself and Jess, Burns borrows from the other woman's strength and makes the hazardous decision to take on her adversary for a third time.

External links 
More about The Devil's Feather on Walters' website
Agent's dedicated page

2005 British novels
Novels by Minette Walters
Novels set in Dorset
Audiobooks
Macmillan Publishers books